Peter Grant (died 1 September 1784) was a Scottish Roman Catholic priest, agent and abbé, later in life an important liaison for British Catholic visitors in Rome.

Life
Grant was born in the diocese of Moray, a member of the Grant family of Blairfind in Glenlivat. He entered the Scotch College at Rome in 1726 and returned to Scotland as a priest in 1735. He was sent to the mission at Glengarry. There he remained until 1737, when, after the murder of the Roman agent Stuart, he was appointed to fill that office.

He became acquainted with British travellers who went to Rome, and rendered them many services. For a long period hardly any British subject of distinction visited Rome without being provided with letters of introduction to the Abbé Grant. Clement XIV was very fond of him, and intended to create him a Cardinal; but died before taking steps.

Grant died at Rome on 1 September 1784.

References

Year of birth missing
1784 deaths
Scottish Roman Catholic priests
18th-century Scottish people
People from Moray
18th-century Christian clergy